Paul John Zammit  (born 28 April 1941) is a former Australian Liberal politician. He was born into the Maltese-Egyptian community in Alexandria, Egypt, the son of a Maltese father and a Greek mother. He and his family migrated to Australia in 1955, aboard SS Strathnaver, and settled in the Sydney suburb of Punchbowl. Zammit was a businessman before entering politics.

He was the member for the state electorate of Burwood from 1984 to 1988. After Burwood was abolished, he was elected as the member for Strathfield at the 1988 state election. In 1991, he was made Assistant Minister to the Premier Nick Greiner and held that post when John Fahey took over as Premier in 1992.

In 1996, Zammit stepped down from state parliament to contest the federal Division of Lowe, which he won. Zammit attracted criticism for announcing that he would seek Liberal pre-selection for Lowe a day after he had been re-elected in Strathfield. It had been understood that he would serve as the member for Strathfield for the full term. In 1998, Zammit resigned from the Liberal Party, citing dissatisfaction with the way the Howard Government was dealing with the problem of aircraft noise, and contested the seat at the 1998 election as an Independent. He gained only 16% of the vote, losing to Labor's John Murphy.

References

1941 births
20th-century Australian politicians
Members of the Australian House of Representatives
Members of the Australian House of Representatives for Lowe
Liberal Party of Australia members of the Parliament of Australia
Independent members of the Parliament of Australia
Members of the New South Wales Legislative Assembly
Living people
Liberal Party of Australia members of the Parliament of New South Wales
Egyptian emigrants to Australia
Australian people of Maltese descent
Australian people of Greek descent